This is a list of animated short films produced by Walt Disney and Walt Disney Animation Studios from 1921 to the present.

This includes films produced at the Laugh-O-Gram Studio which Disney founded in 1921 as well as the animation studio now owned by The Walt Disney Company, previously called the Disney Brothers Cartoon Studio (1923), The Walt Disney Studio (1926), Walt Disney Productions (1929), and Walt Disney Feature Animation (1986).

This list does not include:
 Segments of feature-length package films later released individually (see List of Disney theatrical animated features)
 Animated cartoon segments originally made for television (e.g. Disney's House of Mouse or the Mickey Mouse TV series)
 Short films which contain animation but are primarily live-action (see List of Disney live-action shorts)
 Short films which contain no new animation (i.e., films re-edited from other films)
 Pixar short films
 20th Century Animation short films

Note: A gold star indicates an Academy Award for Best Animated Short Film, while a silver star indicates a nomination.

1920s

1921
{| class="wikitable" style="width:100%;"
|-
! style="width:15%;"| Series || style="width:20%;"| Title || style="width:15%;"| Director || style="width:10%;"| Release Date || style="width:20%;"| DVD Release || style="width:20%;"| Notes
|-
| rowspan="4" | Newman Laugh-O-Grams || Cleaning Up!!? || rowspan="4" | Walt Disney || rowspan="4" | March 20 || rowspan="3"  || First film produced by Laugh-O-Gram Studio, as part of demo reel. This film is not really animated, it just consists of Walt drawing a single frame. First film directed by Walt Disney
|-
| Kansas City Girls Are Rolling Their Own Now || rowspan="2" | This film is not really animated, it just consists of Walt drawing a single frame
|-
| Did You Ever Take a Ride over Kansas City Street 'in a Fliver'''
|-
| Kansas City's Spring Clean-up || A 2-second clip of this short is included in the intro to disc 1 of "Mickey Mouse in Black and White" || First properly animated film produced by Laugh-O-Gram Studio, as part of demo reel
|}

1922

1923

1924

1925

1926

1927

1928

1929

1930s
1930

1931

1932

1933

1934

1935

1936

1937

1938

1939

1940s
1940

1941

1942

1943

1944

1945

1946

1947

1948

1949

1950s
1950
{| class="wikitable" style="width:100%;"
|-
! style="width:15%;"| Series || style="width:20%;"| Title || style="width:15%;"| Director || style="width:10%;"| Release Date || style="width:20%;"| DVD Release || style="width:20%;"| Notes
|-
| Pluto || Pluto's Heart Throb || Charles Nichols || January 6 || "The Complete Pluto, Volume Two" "Mickey & Minnie's Sweetheart Stories" ||
|-
| Donald Duck || Lion Around || Jack Hannah || January 20 || "The Chronological Donald, Volume Three" "Funny Factory with Hewey, Dewey & Louie" ||
|-
| Pluto || Pluto and the Gopher || Charles Nichols || February 10 || "The Complete Pluto, Volume Two" "Best Pals: Mickey and Minnie" ||
|-
| || The Brave Engineer || Jack Kinney || March 3 || "Disney Rarities: Celebrated Shorts: 1920s–1960s" Disney's American Legends ||
|-
| Donald Duck || Crazy Over Daisy || Jack Hannah || March 25 || "The Chronological Donald, Volume Three" "Best Pals: Donald and Daisy" || Only cartoon to co-star Daisy Duck and Chip 'n' Dale
|-
| Pluto || Wonder Dog || Charles Nichols || April 7 || "The Complete Pluto, Volume Two" ||
|-
| Donald Duck || Trailer Horn || Jack Hannah || April 28 || "The Chronological Donald, Volume Three" "Extreme Adventure Fun" ||
|-
| Pluto || Primitive Pluto || Charles Nichols || May 19 || "The Complete Pluto, Volume Two" ||
|-
| Pluto || Puss Cafe || Charles Nichols || June 9 || "The Complete Pluto, Volume Two"  Oliver & Company (20th Anniversary)||
|-
| Goofy || Motor Mania || Jack Kinney || June 30 || "The Complete Goofy" ||
|-
| Pluto || Pests of the West || Charles Nichols || July 21 || "The Complete Pluto, Volume Two" ||
|-
| Pluto || Food for Feudin' || Charles Nichols || August 11 || "The Complete Pluto, Volume Two" "Starring Chip 'n' Dale" Disney's Have a Laugh!, Volume One" ||
|-
| Donald Duck || Hook, Lion and Sinker || Jack Hannah || September 1 || "The Chronological Donald, Volume Three" ||
|-
| Pluto || Camp Dog || Charles Nichols || September 22 || "The Complete Pluto, Volume Two" ||
|-
| Donald Duck || Bee at the Beach || Jack Hannah || October 13 || "The Chronological Donald, Volume Three" "Starring Donald" ||
|-
| Goofy || Hold That Pose || Jack Kinney || November 3 || "The Complete Goofy" "Starring Goofy" || First appearance of Humphrey the Bear.
|-
| || Morris the Midget Moose || Charles Nichols || November 24 || "Disney Rarities: Celebrated Shorts: 1920s–1960s" "Timeless Tales, Volume Three" ||
|-
| Donald Duck || Out on a Limb || Jack Hannah || December 15 || "The Chronological Donald, Volume Three" "Starring Chip 'n' Dale" ||
|}

1951

1952

1953

1954

1955

1956

1957

1958

1959

1960s

1970s

1980s

1990s

2000s

2010s

2020s

Non-theatrical shorts

 Wartime & Industrial shorts

 Educational shorts 
Note: All Educational shorts were mostly produced by Walt Disney Educational productions and were distributed to schools unless otherwise is noted.

 Theme park shorts 

Direct-to-video shorts

 TV specials 

 Internet and Disney+ Original shorts 

Television shorts series programming
Note: Each series were streamed at Disney+

Disney internship program shorts 
The project is under Walt Disney Animation summer internship program (CG & Art intern program), where a group of animation and computer graphics students collaborate and make shorts within two months, under the guidance of Disney animators. The shorts are around 1 minutes.

See also

Intersecting lists of shorts
 Laugh-O-Gram Studio
 List of Pixar shorts
 Alice Comedies
 List of Oswald the Lucky Rabbit shorts
 Mickey Mouse film series
 Silly Symphonies
 Donald Duck filmography
 Pluto (Disney)
 Goofy
 List of Walt Disney's World War II productions for Armed Forces
 List of unproduced Disney animated shorts and feature films
 List of Disney live-action shorts

Related television series
 Disney anthology television series (1954-1983)
 DuckTales (1987–1990)
 Chip 'n Dale Rescue Rangers (1989-1990)
 Goof Troop (1992)
 Bonkers (1993–1995, cameo)
 Quack Pack (1996–1997)
 Mickey Mouse Works (1999–2000)
 Disney's House of Mouse (2001–2003)
 Mickey Mouse Clubhouse (2006–2016)
 Mickey Mouse (2013–2019)
 Mickey Mouse Mixed-Up Adventures (2017–2021)
 The Wonderful World of Mickey Mouse (2020–present)
 Mickey Mouse Funhouse'' (2021–present)

Other
 List of Disney feature-length home entertainment releases
 "Walt Disney Treasures"
 "Walt Disney's Funny Factory"
 "Walt Disney's Classic Cartoon Favorites"
 "Walt Disney's It's a Small World of Fun!"
 List of Disney theatrical animated features
 List of TV series produced by Walt Disney Studios
 List of Disney video games

References

Bibliography

External links
 The Encyclopedia of Disney Animated Shorts

 
American children's animated comedy films
Disney
Animated
Walt Disney Animation
Lists of animated short films